State Route 113 (SR 113) is an east–west highway in north central and northeastern Ohio.  Its western terminus is at SR 269 in Bellevue, where SR 113 is initially concurrent with US 20 and SR 18; its eastern terminus is at the US 6 / SR 2 concurrency in Lakewood. Most of its eastern portion is also in a concurrency with US 20.

History
SR 113 is an original state highway that originally went from SR 9 (now US 127) at the small town of Latty to SR 15 near Continental.  The route's western terminus was extended to the Indiana state line in 1926, replacing SR 194 and part of SR 111, and its eastern terminus was extended to SR 109 north of Ottawa the same year. By 1931, the route had extended to SR 186 near McComb, replacing SR 187. By 1935, the route had extended to SR 18 near Bloomdale.  Three years later it was extended again, this time all the way to Bellevue, by overlapping SR 18 and SR 12, then following the Sandusky County/Seneca County line to Bellevue, replacing SR 185.  SR 113 was extended to Elyria in 1939, replacing SR 59, and to its current eastern terminus in 1940.

In 1959, when the bypass around Fremont opened, SR 113 was rerouted along it, following SR 12 from Bettsville to SR 53, then following that route on the bypass and overlapping US 20 from Fremont to Bellevue, where it continued on its old route to Lakewood.  Except for a small stretch of road in downtown Fostoria, SR 113 was now completely concurrent from Bloomdale to Bellevue.  Thus in 1970, the route was split into two separate highways.  The concurrencies were removed, SR 113 was truncated at Bellevue, and the western part of the route (from the Indiana state line to Fostoria) was recertified as SR 613.

Major junctions

References

113
Transportation in Huron County, Ohio
Transportation in Erie County, Ohio
Transportation in Lorain County, Ohio
Transportation in Cuyahoga County, Ohio